The Nintendo Entertainment System Game Pak is the software storage medium for the Nintendo Entertainment System.

All officially licensed NTSC-U and PAL region cartridges are 13.3 cm (5.25 inches) tall, 12 cm (4.75 inches) wide and 2 cm (0.75 inches) thick. Early NES Game Paks are held together with 5 small, slotted screws. Games released after 1987, designated "Rev-A" on the back label, were redesigned slightly to incorporate two plastic clips molded into the plastic itself, eliminating the need for the top two screws. This is why older NES carts are referred to as "5-screw" and are distinguishable by their flat tops and five screws instead of three. Around this time, the standard screws were changed to 3.8 mm security screws to further secure the ROMs inside from tampering.

The back of the cartridge bears a label with instructions on handling, explaining that the cartridge is not to be stored in extreme temperatures, not to be immersed in water, and not to be cleaned with benzene, thinner, alcohol, or other such solvents. These labels are gray for standard games and gold (or in rare cases silver) for games that feature battery-powered storage. Production and software revision codes were imprinted as stamps on the back label to correspond with the software version and producer.

With the exception of The Legend of Zelda and Zelda II: The Adventure of Link, which are available as gold plastic Game Paks, all licensed NTSC and PAL cartridges are a standard shade of gray plastic.  Unlicensed cartridges were produced in black (Tengen, American Video Entertainment, and Wisdom Tree), robin egg blue (Color Dreams and Wisdom Tree), silver and gold (Camerica), gray (American Game Cartridges), white (Caltron), and clear (Active Enterprises) which bear a slightly different shape and style than a vintage Nintendo-licensed NES Game Pak. Nintendo also produced yellow-plastic carts for internal use at Nintendo Service Centers, although these were never made available for purchase by consumers. The largest officially licensed Game Pak size is 768KB for Kirby's Adventure.

Famicom cartridges are shaped slightly differently, measuring only 6.9 cm (2.75 inches) in length, 10.8 cm (4.25 inches) in width, and 1.7 cm (0.6875 inches) in thickness. The NES uses a 72-pin interface and the Famicom uses a 60-pin design. Some early NES games, most commonly Gyromite, include 60-pin Famicom PCBs and ROMs with a built-in converter. Unlike the predominantly gray colored NES Game Paks, official Famicom cartridges were produced in many colors of plastic. Adaptors, similar in design to the popular accessory Game Genie, are available that allow Famicom games to be played on an NES.

60-pin vs. 72-pin

The Famicom, the Japanese version of the NES, has a 60-pin cartridge design. This yields smaller cartridges than the NES, which has a 72-pin design. Four pins are used for the 10NES lockout chip. Ten pins were added that connect a cartridge directly to the expansion port on the bottom of the unit. Finally, two pins that allow cartridges to provide their own sound expansion chips were removed. Some early NES cartridges house the same printed circuit boards as their Famicom counterparts, using a converter (such as the T89 Cartridge Converter) to allow them to fit inside the internally compatible NES hardware. Nintendo did this to reduce costs and inventory by using the same PCBs in North America and Japan. The cartridge dimensions of the original Famicom measure at 10.8 × 6.9 × 1.7 cm, compared with 12 × 13.3 × 2 cm for its North American redesign.

External sound chips
The Famicom has two cartridge pins that were originally intended to facilitate the Disk System's own sound chip, but are also used by cartridge games to provide sound enhancements. In the design of the NES, these pins were removed from the cartridge port and relocated to the bottom expansion port. As a result, individual cartridges can not make use of this audio functionality, and many NES localizations have technologically inferior sound compared to their equivalent Famicom versions, such as Castlevania III: Dracula's Curse.

Third-party manufacturing
In Japan, Konami, Namco, Bandai, Taito, Irem, Jaleco, and Sunsoft manufactured their own game cartridges for the Famicom. This allowed these companies to design their own customized chips for specific purposes, such as the increased sound quality of Konami's VRC 6 and VRC 7 chips. Internationally, all licensed NES cartridges were made by Nintendo except Konami and Acclaim, who produced their own PCBs, but used Nintendo's provided gray cartridge shells.

See also
 Memory management controller (MMC), the main chips which can be deployed inside of each Game Pak, to extend the NES or Famicom's capabilities
 Super Nintendo Entertainment System Game Pak
 Nintendo 64 Game Pak

References

Nintendo Entertainment System
Video game storage media